The 1951 Milan–San Remo was the 42nd edition of the Milan–San Remo cycle race and was held on 19 March 1951. The race started in Milan and finished in San Remo. The race was won by Louison Bobet.

General classification

References

1951
1951 in road cycling
1951 in Italian sport
1951 Challenge Desgrange-Colombo
March 1951 sports events in Europe